"Always Be My Baby" is a song recorded by American singer-songwriter, and record producer Mariah Carey for her fifth studio album, Daydream (1995). It was released by Columbia Records on February 20, 1996, as the third single in the United States and fourth worldwide. Written and produced by Carey, Jermaine Dupri and Manuel Seal, "Always Be My Baby" is a midtempo song, with lyrics describing the feeling of attachment and unity the singer feels towards her estranged lover, even though they are no longer together, she says he will always be a part of her and will "always be her baby" even after they move on.

"Always Be My Baby" received critical acclaim with reviewers praising it's mellow production and Carey's vocals. The song was a commercial success, becoming Carey's eleventh chart topper on the Billboard Hot 100, tying her with Madonna and Whitney Houston for most number-one singles by a female artist at the time. It spent two weeks atop the chart and became Carey's eighth chart-topper on the Canadian RPM Top Singles chart. The song is certified five-times platinum in the US with 1,254,000 units coming from physical sales, 890,000 coming from digital sales, and 856,000 coming from streaming equivalent units.It is also certified platinum by RIAA for selling 1 million units as master tone in the Us by 2007. In other regions, the single performed well, peaking at number three in the United Kingdom, number five in New Zealand, number 17 in Australia and in the top 20 in most music markets where it charted.

The accompanying music video for "Always Be My Baby" features scenes of Carey frolicking by a campsite in upstate New York, as well as swinging on a Cooper Tire over a lake. Additional inter-cuts include scenes of two children, one male and female, sneaking out at night and spending time together by a campfire similar to Carey's location. Most scenes from the video were filmed at The Fresh Air Fund's Camp Mariah, named after Carey for her generous support and dedication to Fresh Air Fund children. The song was performed live during her Daydream World Tour (1996) and many of her future tours and concerts. "Always Be My Baby" was also featured in Carey's compilation albums: #1's (1998), Greatest Hits (2001), The Ballads (2008) and #1 to Infinity (2015). The U.S. and Canadian B-side "Slipping Away" is included in the compilation album The Rarities (2020).

Background and recording 
While Carey was writing and commencing the recording of Daydream from late 1994, she began searching for different producers, in order to give her work a new sound. Jermaine Dupri, who had risen to fame during that period and previously remixed Carey's song "Never Forget You" for its single release in 1994, began working with Carey on material for her album. After recording the song in December 1994, Carey recalled that she chose to work with Dupri because he had a "very distinct vibe." Additionally, Carey commissioned the assistance of hip-hop and contemporary R&B producer, Manuel Seal. As Seal played different keys on the piano, Carey led him with the melody she was "hearing inside her head" and began humming the phrase "always be my baby." In an interview with Fred Bronson, Carey discussed the process it took to write and produce the song:
Jermaine, Manuel and I sat down and Jermaine programmed the drums. I told him the feel I wanted and Manuel put his hands on the keyboards and I started singing the melody. We went back and forth with the bridge and the B-section. I had the outline of the lyrics and started singing 'Always be my baby' off the top of my head.
"Always Be My Baby" marked the first of several collaborations between Carey and Dupri. Like producers before him, Dupri commended Carey's vocal abilities, "she can pretty much do anything with her voice. She's really strong vocally." Another musical craft the song featured was the inclusion of heavy background vocals of her lower registers, with Carey then belting and singing the higher notes over her background vocals and melody, creating a "double voice effect." When discussing the technique used in the background vocals, Carey said:
The background vocals are an important part of the picture for me. That's why I like to do them myself a lot of the time, or initially I'll lay down the tracks. I'll double my voice or do a couple of tracks of my own voice. It's easy for me to match my voice. And then if I'm going to use other background singers, I'll let them go on top of mine.

Composition 

"Always Be My Baby" is a "carefree" midtempo ballad, which incorporates pop and R&B genres. Rolling Stone contributor Brittany Spanos identified the track as "one of her more straightforward pop hits from the early portion of her career, featuring a catchy chorus and one of her most tender vocal performances." It has a "relaxed pop" tempo of 80 beats per minute. The song features a "double voice" which is an effect Carey created in the studio, where her lower vocal notes are used as backup, and her higher chest notes are used as the song's main focal point. Carey's vocal range spans two octaves and one semitone from the low note of E3 to the high note of F5. Describing the track as "buoyant", Pitchfork's Jamieson Cox wrote that "there are moments ... where all you hear is Mariah singing over rock-solid piano chords," finding the arrangement and simplicity "almost surprising given her taste for the ostentatious." Jordan Runtagh, writing for People, described the song as "somewhere between a breezy love song and wistful breakup ode". The Daily Telegraph described the track as a love song whose "lyrics describe the sense of attachment Carey still feels towards her former lover". Its lyrics feature several ad libs, opening with "doo-doo-doo dow", which is also used throughout the song's chorus.

Critical reception 
"Always Be My Baby" received acclaim from music critics. Larry Flick from Billboard described it as "a delightfully bright and funky finger-snapper". He added that "the pop princess reminds us that she has the loose-wristed soul to go with those deliciously soaring and dramatic high notes amid a sweet arrangement of easy acoustic guitars, rolling piano lines, and chipper jeep beats." Daina Darzin from Cash Box noted its "swoop of pure, airy harmonies and gently syncopated R&B rhythms". Ken Tucker from Entertainment Weekly complimented the song's "relaxed swing", and felt that its instrumentation helped make it a standout from the album. Alan Jones from Music Week stated that "it's a concise, fairly subdued and very catchy tune and a fine showcase for Carey, who resists the temptation to indulge too heavily in vocal gymnastics." Stephen Holden, editor of The New York Times, complimented "Always Be My Baby," calling it one of "the best on the album." At the 38th Grammy Awards the song received a nomination for Best Female R&B Vocal Performance. In 2017, Rolling Stone readers voted "Always Be My Baby" the fifth greatest song of Carey's career, while Entertainment Weekly ranked the song second in a similar poll, writing, "there’s no way we would ever try to shake her — even if we didn’t know yet that “always” really would last this long." Ranking "Always Be My Baby" Carey's second best number-one song, Glenn Gamboa of Newsday noted that the song "still shows off her legendary range, but also shows that she can be chill and laid-back enough to make 'doobedoo oh' work as a chorus."

Accolades

Chart performance 
"Always Be My Baby" was released by Columbia Records on March 9, 1996, in Europe,  and debuted at number two on the Billboard Hot 100 on the issue dated April 6, 1996, behind Celine Dion's "Because You Loved Me," which had replaced Carey's previous single, "One Sweet Day", at number one. "Always Be My Baby" stayed at number two for four weeks, and topped the Hot 100 on May 4, 1996, where it spent two weeks before returning to the number two position for an additional five weeks. At the end of its US chart run, the song spent a total of nine weeks at number two, the fourth longest stay in the chart's history. The song became Carey's 11th chart topper in the United States, tying her with Madonna and Whitney Houston as the female solo artist with the most number-one singles, a record she soon passed. After spending two weeks atop the Hot 100, the three singles from Daydream had given Carey a combined 26 weeks (six months) atop the chart, something never duplicated by another artist until Usher and the Black Eyed Peas in the mid to late 2000s. In Canada, the song became Carey's eighth chart topper, after it ascended to the number one position on the Canadian RPM Singles Chart during the week of May 20, 1996.

While it charted well inside the US, the song didn't manage to chart as high as her previous two singles "Fantasy" and "One Sweet Day" elsewhere. In Australia, the song entered the Australian Singles Chart at number 28 during the week of March 13, 1996. The song spent 16 weeks fluctuating in the chart before spending its last week at number 47 on June 30. "Always Be My Baby" was certified double platinum by the Australian Recording Industry Association (ARIA), denoting sales and streams of over 140,000. The song debuted and peaked at number five in New Zealand, spending three consecutive weeks at the position. After 16 weeks, the song fell off the singles chart and was certified gold by the Recording Industry Association of New Zealand (RIANZ). In the United Kingdom, the song entered the UK Singles Chart at number three, where it peaked. In its second week, the song fell to number four, staying on the chart for a total of ten weeks. As of 2008, sales in the UK are estimated at 220,000. In Ireland, the song peaked at number ten on the Irish Singles Chart, spending nine weeks in the chart. In the Netherlands, "Always Be My Baby" entered the singles chart at number 43 during the week on April 20, 1996. The song peaked at number 27, spending one week at the position and five weeks in the chart overall. "Always Be My Baby" entered the singles chart in Sweden at number 58 during the week of May 3, 1996. After peaking at number 38 and spending a total of five weeks in the chart, the song fell off the Swedish Singles Chart.

Music video 

The accompanying music video for "Always Be My Baby" was the second video Carey's directed. In it, she is the seemingly happy narrator of a tale of young love, as a young boy and a girl elope in the middle of the night. The video was filmed on location at Carey's sponsored charity, the Fresh Air Fund upstate New York camp. The video begins with scenes of Carey, in a denim jacket, jeans, and bare feet, on a lakeside tire-swing, smiling and beginning to retell a story of young love. As she sits upon the swing, scenes of two children sneaking out of their bungalow in the middle of the night are shown. They frolic together beside a fireplace, soon coming up to the lakeside swing Carey had been on before. They soon go swimming wearing their clothes, much like Carey did in her video for "Dreamlover" though she does not jump into the water herself this time. As they jump into the water, Carey is then seen by the campfire they passed on their journey to the lake, smiling with friends and enjoying herself by the fire. Eventually the boy and girl are seen kissing underwater. The video concludes with scenes of the young boy and girl walking together back to their bungalow, walking hand-in-hand. Having possibly witnessed the entire event, Carey is seen once again by the large swing, chuckling and staring into the night's sky. On August 14, 2020, the music video was re-released in a remastered form, in HD quality.

An alternate video was shot for the song's remix. It too was directed by Carey, and was shot in black and white. The shot of Carey in a beret that would become the cover for this single is a scene from the video. The video features Da Brat and Xscape and a cameo appearance by Jermaine Dupri. It begins with Carey and the others recording in Carey's in-home studio. In the video, Carey is wearing a large white, puffy jacket and long golden hair. Scenes of Carey by her indoor pool are shown, with cameos made by her dog, Jack.  Da Brat and Xscape are seen poolside with Carey, playing cards and drinking beer, as they further bond and laugh.  Towards the end of the video, scenes of the studio are shown, intermingled with snippets of Carey walking inside the mansion she shared with then-husband Tommy Mottola. The video ends with Carey and Da Brat bonding by the studio and pool.

Live performances and cover versions 
Carey performed the song throughout the entire run of her Daydream World Tour (1996), Rainbow World Tour (2000), The Adventures of Mimi (2006), The Elusive Chanteuse Show (2014), Caution World Tour (2019) and during select shows on her Charmbracelet World Tour (2002–03),  and Angels Advocate Tour (2009–10). During the Japanese shows in 1996, Carey donned a white suit and jacket, and featured three female back-up singers. Red spotlights were used throughout the performance, as well as some light dance routines During her Rainbow World Tour, Carey wore a two piece outfit, a pair of pants and top, with golden heels. Three back-up singers were provided, one male and two female, while Carey interacted with the front row fans. On her Adventures of Mimi Tour in 2006, Carey donned a pair of black leggings, worn with a bikini-like top. Wearing Christian Louboutin pumps, Carey sang on the arena's secondary stage, where she sang three of the set-list's titles. On her Elusive Chanteuse Show in 2014, Carey often used the song as her encore, entering the stage in a tight-fitted blue gown and black gloves. Carey included the song in her 2015 Las Vegas residency, Mariah Carey Number 1's, where she walked through the audience for the second verse and chorus. Carey also included the song in her 2018–2019 Las Vegas residency The Butterfly Returns, where she was accompanied by her children Moroccan and Monroe in selected dates.

On the seventh season of American Idol, David Cook performed a rock arrangement of the song during the April 15, 2008, episode, in which Carey mentored the contestants on her songs. His version received high praise from all three judges, and even Carey herself. Cook's studio recording of the song was released on the iTunes Store during the show's run as "Always Be My Baby (American Idol Studio Version) – Single" and was among the season's best-selling singles.

In 2020, during the COVID-19 pandemic, Carey closed out FOX's iHeart Living Room Concert for America with the song.

Remixes 
The main remix for the song was also produced by Jermaine Dupri.  Known as the "Mr. Dupri Mix," it features re-sung vocals with all of the lyrics and most of the melodic structure retained while using a sample of the song "Tell Me If You Still Care" by The SOS Band.  It includes a rap from Da Brat and background vocals from Xscape.

Carey recorded yet another set of vocals for dance remixes produced by David Morales that were initially only released on maxi-single in the UK until their release in the US as part of "#MC30", a promotional campaign marking the 30th anniversary of Carey's self-titled debut. The main dance remix, named the "Always Club Mix" (along with its edit, the "Def Classic Radio Mix"), has a totally new melodic structure and lyrics altered to fit the new melody and song structure. DJ Satoshi Tomiie also created a dance dub that used these new vocals; calling it the "ST Dub," it appeared on the maxi-single that included the Morales mixes.

Other versions 
The original album vocals were also remixed into a reggae version that included Jamaican-American reggae rap artist Li'l Vicious.  Called the "Reggae Soul Mix," this remix includes a rap breakdown by Vicious, with him shouting over Carey's vocals throughout the track.

In 2021, Carey recorded a new version of the song which was included in the HBO Max's animated television special, The Runaway Bunny based on the book of the same name.

Track listings 

 Worldwide CD single
 "Always Be My Baby" (album version) – 4:19
 "Always Be My Baby" (Mr. Dupri Mix) [feat. Da Brat & Xscape] – 4:43
 "Always Be My Baby" (Mr. Dupri Extended Mix) [feat. Da Brat & Xscape] – 5:33
 "Always Be My Baby" (Reggae Soul Mix) [feat. Lil' Vicious] – 4:56
 "Always Be My Baby" (Mr. Dupri No Rap Radio Mix) [feat. Xscape] – 3:44

 US 7-inch single
 "Always Be My Baby" – 4:18
 "Long Ago" – 4:32

 US and Canada CD single
 "Always Be My Baby" (album version) – 4:18
 "Always Be My Baby" (Mr. Dupri Mix) – 4:40
 "Slipping Away" – 4:30

 Worldwide 12-inch single
 "Always Be My Baby" (Always Club) – 10:51
 "Always Be My Baby" (Dub-A-Baby) – 7:16
 "Always Be My Baby" (Groove a Pella) – 7:15
 "Always Be My Baby" (ST Dub) – 7:12

 UK CD single (Part 1)
 "Always Be My Baby" (Album Version) – 4:17
 "Always Be My Baby" (Mr. Dupri Extended Mix) – 5:33
 "Always Be My Baby" (Mr. Dupri No Rap Radio Mix) – 3:43
 "Always Be My Baby" (Reggae Soul Mix) – 4:54
 "Always Be My Baby" (Reggae Soul Dub Mix) – 4:53

 UK CD single (Part 2)
 "Always Be My Baby" (Def Classic Radio Mix) – 4:08
 "Always Be My Baby" (Always Club Mix) – 10:24
 "Always Be My Baby" (Dub-A-Baby) – 7:15
 "Always Be My Baby" (Groove A Pella) – 7:08
 "Always Be My Baby" (ST Dub) – 7:13

 Always Be My Baby EP
 "Always Be My Baby" (feat. Da Brat & Xscape – Mr. Dupri Mix) – 4:42
 "Always Be My Baby" (feat. Xscape – Mr. Dupri No Rap Radio Mix) – 3:43
 "Always Be My Baby" (feat. Da Brat & Xscape – Mr. Dupri Extended Mix) – 5:32
 "Always Be My Baby" (Def Classic Radio Version) – 4:09
 "Always Be My Baby" (Always Club Mix) – 10:26
 "Always Be My Baby" (Groove A Pella) – 7:10
 "Always Be My Baby" (Dub-A-Baby) – 7:16
 "Always Be My Baby" (ST Dub) – 7:14
 "Always Be My Baby" (Live at Madison Square Garden – October 1995) – 3:48

Credits and personnel 
Credits are adapted from the Daydream liner notes.
 Mariah Carey – co-production, arrangement, songwriting, vocals, background vocals
 Jermaine Dupri – co-production, songwriting
 Manuel Seal Jr. – co-production, songwriting

Charts

Weekly charts

Year-end charts

Decade-end charts

Certifications and sales

Release history

References 

Works cited
 
 

1990s ballads
1996 singles
Mariah Carey songs
Billboard Hot 100 number-one singles
RPM Top Singles number-one singles
Pop ballads
Music videos directed by Mariah Carey
Songs written by Mariah Carey
Songs written by Manuel Seal
Songs written by Jermaine Dupri
Song recordings produced by Jermaine Dupri
1995 songs
1996 songs
Columbia Records singles
Sony Music singles
Contemporary R&B ballads